Norman Rockett (August 8, 1911 – April 5, 1996) was an American set decorator. He was nominated for two Academy Awards in the category Best Art Direction.

Selected filmography
 The Greatest Story Ever Told (1965)
 Planet of the Apes (1968)
 Tora! Tora! Tora! (1970)

References

External links

American set decorators
People from Los Angeles
1911 births
1996 deaths
Emmy Award winners